Alexander Gennadievich Lipin (born 10 December 1985) is a Kazakhstani professional ice hockey defenceman who currently plays with Yertis Pavlodar and Nomad Astana of the Kazakhstan Hockey Championship. He has formerly played Barys Astana in the Kontinental Hockey League (KHL).

References

External links

1985 births
Living people
Barys Nur-Sultan players
Sportspeople from Oskemen
Kazakhstani ice hockey defencemen
Kazzinc-Torpedo players
Nomad Astana players
Yertis Pavlodar players
Universiade medalists in ice hockey
Universiade silver medalists for Kazakhstan
Competitors at the 2011 Winter Universiade
Competitors at the 2013 Winter Universiade